Mk'hono is a community council located in the Quthing District of Lesotho. Its population in 2006 was 9,840.

Villages
The community of Mk'hono includes the villages of: 
 
 Bolula
 Boshoa-poho
 Chache
 Ha Bolomo
 Ha Boroko
 Ha Jobo (Moreneng)
 Ha Kholoa
 Ha Kopolane
 Ha Lebelonyane
 Ha Lebelonyane (Sekiring)
 Ha Lebesele
 Ha Lekhoele
 Ha Mabina
 Ha Machakela
 Ha Mahatanya
 Ha Majara
 Ha Makhoali
 Ha Mapena
 Ha Mashapha
 Ha Matlali
 Ha Mofomme
 Ha Mohale
 Ha Mohlakoana
 Ha Monoana
 Ha Morai
 Ha Mothamane
 Ha Mphori
 Ha Nonyana
 Ha Ramollo
 Ha Rasebotsa
 Ha Raseeng
 Ha Rasofia
 Ha Ratema
 Ha Sekhaola
 Ha Sekoati
 Ha Selatile
 Ha Sello
 Ha Setoi
 Ha Sheleri
 Ha Tanyele
 Ha Tobia
 Ha Tsoinyane
 Khohlong
 Khubetsoana
 Koung
 Kueneng (Ha Halahala)
 Lekhalaneng
 Letlapeng
 Letsatseng
 Lichecheng
 Likhokhotsing
 Likonyeleng
 Lilepeng
 Lintlheng
 Lithakong
 Litsineng
 Litšoeneng
 Macheseng
 Maebaneng
 Makaoteng
 Makatseng
 Manyalasing
 Maphakatlaling
 Mapheaneng
 Mapolaneng
 Matamong
 Matebeleng
 Metsi-Masooana
 Moeaneng
 Mokekeng
 Mosafeleng
 Nicefield
 Ntšoasolle
 Peka
 Phuleng
 Phuthing
 Polateng
 Qheeba
 Sekokoaneng
 Taung
 Thaba-Chitja
 Thabana-Mofoli
 Thepung
 Tiping
 Tolong and Tsekong

References

External links
 Google map of community villages

Populated places in Quthing District